Kundanahalli  is a village in Karnataka, India.

Geography 
It is located 79 km towards west from District headquarters Mysore, 7 km from Piriyapatna, 214 km from State capital Bangalore.

Muttur (4 km), Chittenahalli (5 km), Kampalapura (6 km), Bylakuppe (7 km), Piriyapatna (8 km) are nearby villages. Kundanahalli is surrounded by Virajpet Taluk towards South, Hunsur Taluk towards East, Somvarpet Taluk towards North, Madikeri Taluk towards west . 

Madikeri and Mysore are the nearby Cities to Kundanahalli.

Demographics
The local language is Kannada. The population is 675, in 164 houses. The female population is 52.3%. The male literacy rate is 69.2% and the female literacy rate is 33.6%. The Scheduled Tribe population is 139. The Scheduled Caste number 42. The working population is 60.6%. The under 7 population is 84, including 39 girls.

Politics 
JD(S), BJP and INC are the major political parties.

Transport

Rail
The nearest railway station is more than 10 km away.

Road
Piriyapatna, Kushalnagar, Hunsur connect by road.

See also
 Mysore
 Districts of Karnataka

References

External links
 http://Mysore.nic.in/

Villages in Mysore district